is a Japanese TV Asahi cooking program. It airs every week on Saturday.

Airing
First Period (0:30 - 1:00): April 7, 2001 - December 2003
First Period (17:00 - 17:30): January 17, 2004 - September 26, 2009
Second Period (10:30 - 11:10): June 9, 2018 - present

History 
It started out on April 7, 2001 as a Johnny's late-night show in which the Juniors were in their pajamas in a 'club house'. The program was aimed at teenage girls, so it looked like a sleep over. The Juniors discussed various topics, including trips. These were shown in flashback, as they went around the city, learning different skills such as Ballroom dancing, or Jump rope. There were also competitions. Yearly there was a swimming competition between two teams. The show almost always ended with a song. Sometimes there were visits from older Juniors such as Tackey or the Kansai Juniors, such as Ryo Nishikido. Members such as Shunsuke Kazama, Jun Hasegawa, Jimmy Mackey and KAT-TUN were main Juniors in this version.

However, on January 17, 2004 the program underwent a renewal. Because the gourmet segments on the earlier version had been very popular the program was changed to a gourmet show. At the same time it was moved to the spot on Saturday, 5 pm.

Show 
Main theme for the show is food, but unlike many food shows on Japanese TV the only time cooking comes into the view is the end segment when one recipe is shown. The rest of the time Seven Sages with two guests visit restaurants and small cafes, tasting food and recommending places to the viewers.

Every food they taste is given a price tag and every place is shown on the map. All the places visited in the episode are listed in the end of the show, complete with addresses and phone numbers, and then added to the list on the site, along with featured recipe.

Seven sages 
Seven famous cooks and food critics who take turns leading the show are called .

They are:
 
 , born on March 21, 1958
 
 , born on February 8, 1957
 
 , born on March 21, 1947

Guest sages

Regulars

First Period
Every episode two boys from Johnny's Jimusho join the sage of the day.

Second Period
HiHi Jets
Bishōnen

Narrators

First Period
Descriptions of food shown on screen are provided by two voice actors:

Second Period

References

External links
 Hadaka no Shounen - official site

Johnny & Associates
Japanese cooking television series
TV Asahi original programming
2000s cooking television series
2010s cooking television series
2000s Japanese television series
2010s Japanese television series